General Ramos may refer to:

Antonio J. Ramos (born 1946), U.S. Air Force brigadier general
Antonio Sagardía Ramos (1880–1962), Spanish Army general of the artillery
Fidel V. Ramos (1928–2022), Armed Forces of the Philippines general
Luiz Eduardo Ramos (born 1956), Brazilian Army four-star general